This article lists major rebellions and revolutions that have taken place during Brazilian history.

Colonial Brazil (1500–1822)

 Vila Rica Revolt (1720)
 Slave Rebellions (From its peak in the mid-17th century until the abolition of slavery)
 Inconfidência Mineira (1789)
 Tailors' Conspiracy (1798)
 Pernambucan Revolt (1817)

Empire of Brazil (1822–1889)

 Confederation of the Equator (1824)
 Irish and German Mercenary Soldiers' Revolt (1828)
 Cabanada (1832-1835)
 Ragamuffin War (1835–1845)
 Malê Revolt (1835)
 Sabinada (1837–38)
 Cabanagem (1835–1840)
 Balaiada (1838–1841)
 Liberal rebellions (1842)
 Praieira revolt (1848)
 Quebra–Quilos revolt (1874–1875)

Republic (1889–present)

1st Republican period (1889–1930)

 Naval Revolt (1891–94)
 Federalist Revolution (1893–95)
 War of Canudos (1896–97)
 Vaccine Revolt (1904)
 Revolt of the Lash (1910)
 Contestado War (1912–1916)
 Anarchist General Strikes (1917–19)
 Lieutenant Revolts (1922–1927)
 Revolution of 1930

Vargas Era (1930–1945)

 Constitutionalist Revolution (July – October, 1932)
 Communist Uprising (November, 1935)
 Integralist Putsch (May, 1938)

2nd Republican period (1946–1964)

 The 1964 Brazilian coup d'état

Military dictatorship (1964–1985)

 Urban Guerrillas (1968–71)
 Rural Guerrillas 
 Caparaó guerrilla (1967)
 Araguaia guerrilla (1972–74)

See also
 Brazilian War of Independence
 Military history of Brazil
 List of wars involving Brazil

Notes

 
 
Rebellions